Bassetti may refer to:

People
 Fred Bassetti (1917–2013), American architect
 Gualtiero Bassetti (born 1942), Italian cardinal of the Roman Catholic Church
 Marco Antonio Bassetti (1586–1630), Italian painter
 Marco Bassetti (born 1957), Italian manager and entrepreneur
 Paolo Bassetti (born 1964), Italian economist
 Samuel "Sam" Bassetti (born 1991), American cyclist

Other uses
 Bassetti, an Italian textile company
 Bassetti Architects, an architectural firm based in Seattle, Washington 
 Enatimene bassetti, a marine gastropod mollusk in the family Muricidae

See also
 Bassett (disambiguation)